Vatica mangachapoi is a species of plant in the family Dipterocarpaceae.

It is a tree found in the Malesia and Indochina floristic regions: including Brunei, eastern China (Hainan Island), Malaysia, the Philippines, Thailand, and Vietnam.

References

Further reference
Yide, Li. "The Resource and Community Characteristics of Vatica mangachapoi Forest in Jianfengling National Nature Reserve, Hainan Island [J]." Scientia Silvae Sinicae 1 (2006).
Lan, Guo-yu, Wei Chen, and Xiao-fei Zhou. "Community characteristics of Vatica mangachapoi forest of Bawangling in Hainan, South China." Acta Botanica Boreali-Occidentalia Sinica 27.9 (2007): 1861.

mangachapoi
Trees of China
Trees of Borneo
Trees of the Philippines
Trees of Thailand
Trees of Vietnam
Critically endangered flora of Asia
Taxonomy articles created by Polbot
Taxa named by Francisco Manuel Blanco